I Wanna Be A Model (我要做 Model) is the Malaysian version of Make Me A Supermodel. The show is open to all Malaysians who can speak fluent Mandarin.

The first season premiered on August 5, 2006. The first two seasons were hosted by Dylan Liong and Lynn Lim. Season 3 welcomed two new judges, Jeffrey Cheng and Cheryl Lee. The fourth season featured Lynn Lim as the host with Shir Chong, Colin Sim and Sean Feng as mentors.

Seasons

See also
Malaysian Dreamgirl

References

 
2006 Malaysian television series debuts
2009 Malaysian television series endings
8TV (Malaysian TV network) original programming